Miss Fiji is a national Beauty pageant in Fiji.

History
In 1956 Miss Fiji Pageant Association held in under local government and Fiji Airways. The previous pageant was known by Miss Hibiscus National Pageant. The first Miss Fiji was Liebling Marlow. In 1979 Fiji started to compete at the Miss Universe pageant with Tanya Whiteside.

International winners
Miss South Pacific
2016 — Anne Dunn
2011 — Alisi Rabukawaqa
2009 — Merewalesi Nailatikau

Titleholders

Representatives at Big Four international pageants
The Miss Fiji has competed at the Big Four international beauty pageants since 1979. In 2007 there was Miss Fiji Earth which held the official contest for Miss Earth and continued in 2012 by You and Me Talent Fiji Foundation. In 2012 there was Miss Fiji World which holds the official contest to find the Miss World Fiji representative to represent her country at the Miss World. In 2014 Miss Earth Fiji together joined with Miss Earth Tonga and Miss Earth Samoa to select the three queens for the Miss Earth headed by Mr. Tito Lavashe Couture-Stowers. In Miss Universe, Fiji made its debut in 1979 and last competed in 1981. In 2017, Fiji debut at Miss Grand International.

Miss Fiji Universe

Miss Fiji World

Miss Fiji International

Miss Fiji Earth

References

External links
Official Miss World Fiji page

Fiji
Fiji
Fiji
Recurring events established in 1979
Fijian awards